Govindpura is an area in the BHEL township in the city of Bhopal, India.

Etymology
In Sanskrit, Govindpura means the place of Govind, one of the names of Lord Krishna, a Hindu deity.

Points of interest

Restaurants
Govindpura has many roadside dhabas and small eating places.

Schools
 Hema School
 Gandhi School
 Government Girls High School
 Vidya Niketan
 Raman Higher Secondary School
 St John's School
Carmel Convent Senior Secondary Girls School

Getting there and orientation
The easiest way to get to Govindpura is to board one of the private buses that run in Bhopal. Auto rickshaws are also a very popular mode of transport.

Industrial estate
Govindpura has a sprawling industrial estate that comprises mainly ancillary industries to BHEL.

Neighbourhoods in Bhopal
 Govindpura pincode is 462023.